Haliclystus stejnegeri is a species of stalked jellyfish in the family Haliclystidae.

References

Haliclystidae